{{Infobox film
| name           = Mehlon Ke Khwab
| image          = Mehlon Ke Khwab film.jpeg
| caption        = 
| director       = Muhafiz Haider| producer       = MadhubalaMadhubala Private Ltd.
| writer         = 
| screenplay     = 
| story          = 
| based_on       = 
| starring       = MadhubalaKishore KumarPradeep Kumar
| narrator       = 
| music          = S. MohinderAnand Bakshi (lyricist)
| cinematography = 
| editing        = 
| studio         = 
| distributor    = 
| released       = 9 March 1960
| runtime        = 
| country        = India
| language       = Hindi
| budget         = 
| gross          = 
}}Mehlon Ke Khwab is a 1960 Indian Hindi-language comedy film directed by Muhafiz Haider and starring Madhubala, Kishore Kumar and Pradeep Kumar.One of the three films produced by Madhubala under the banner of Madhubala Private Ltd., Mehlon Ke Khwab revolves around two aspiring actresses who are framed for stealing a precious necklace.

 Plot 
The film revolves around two girls, Asha (Madhubala) and Bela (Chanchal), who round up a holiday after winning a lottery but end up being framed for stealing a precious necklace.

 Cast 
 Pradeep Kumar as Chander
 Kishore Kumar as Rajan
 Madhubala as Asha
  Chanchal as Bela
 K. N. Singh as Motilal
 Pran as Prakash
 Om Prakash as Hotel Manager
 Leela Chitnis

 Soundtrack 
The soundtrack of Mehlon Ke Khwab was composed by S. Mohinder and the lyrics were penned by Anand Bakshi.

1. "Kamla Razia Ya Miss Mary" – Kishore Kumar, Asha Bhosle, Mahendra Kapoor 

2. "Ae Jaan-e-Jigar" – Kishore Kumar, Asha Bhosle 

3. "Gar Tum Bura Na Mano" – Asha Bhonsle, Subir Sen

4. "Is Duniya Mein" – Asha Bhonsle, Geeta Dutt 

5. "Lo Ji Bujh Gayi Bijli Pyar Ki"  – Kishore Kumar

6. "Piyo Piyo Nazar Pilati Hai" – Asha Bhonsle

7. "Ye Hai Jeevan Ki Rail" – Kishore Kumar

 Reception Mehlon Ke Khwab'', although critically praised, was unsuccessful at the box office.

References

External links 
 
1960 films
1960s Hindi-language films
Indian comedy films
1960 comedy films
Hindi-language comedy films